Landlocked Switzerland supports a small commercial fishing industry in its many large lakes. About 200 fishermen nationally ply them in small boats, supplemented by fish farmers who largely raise trout with some carp. The former catch primarily perch and whitefish, with pike, lake trout and Arctic char making up significant portions of the country's  annual catch. Angling is also popular, while fish processing is marginal, largely limited to making fish oil for the country's drug industry.

While some of the Swiss catch is exported, mostly to neighboring countries, the country runs a large trade deficit in fish and fish products, with imports serving most of the market, largely in the food sector, as tastes have shifted towards seafood. Within Switzerland, the French-speaking population consumes 60 percent of the fish, three times its share of the population.

Switzerland's largest lake, Lake Geneva, shared with France, is also its most productive fishery, providing a fifth of the total catch, including almost half its perch. Lake Zürich, fifth largest by area, is the second most productive Swiss fishery, with the largest share of the country's whitefish catch. Lake Neuchâtel produces the largest portion of lake trout, and small Lake Sempach is fourth in whitefish. The smallest Swiss lake that supports a commercial fishery is Lake Hallwil.

Fish have been an important part of the Swiss diet since at least the Middle Ages; by the late 17th century catches in Lake Geneva were already being strictly regulated. Today the cantons are the primary fishing regulators, with federal law setting the guiding principles; the large lakes that Switzerland shares with its neighboring countries are managed by international commissions. The total number of fishermen has declined in the late 20th and early 21st centuries along with catches, a phenomenon the fishermen attribute to the country's success in reducing pollution in its lakes, to the point that aquaculture now accounts for the majority of the industry's output.

History

Prehistory–Roman era: Archaeological evidence

Paleolithic archaeological sites in Switzerland have yielded extensive evidence of fishing in the lakes. Those associated with Cortaillod culture have well-documented fishing nets and traps, along with other tools such as harpoons and skewers. Fishermen of that era, it is believed, primarily used the seine fishing, stretching nets between a boat and a stake planted in the lake bottom in shallow waters and between two boats in deep water, sometimes supplemented by gill nets or longlines.

Evidence from the Roman era supports the existence of a trade in fish products. Sealed amphorae found at Aventicum contained garum, a popular condiment of the times made from spices and marine fish, and allec, a paste used as a precursor. By the Middle Ages, the Swiss had also begun importing herring, dried sole and other stockfish caught in the Baltic Sea from those cities in what is now Germany.

Middle Ages: Feudal regulation

Fish were commercially important at least around Lake Geneva by the middle of the 12th century. A declaration of tribute made to the Priory of St. Jean de Genéve in 1150 includes wine, cheese, and several large fish. The species named include trout, pike and omble chevalier, known in English as the Arctic char. It is the earliest mention of the latter species' presence in Lake Geneva.

There was enough fishing on Lake Geneva in the early Middle Ages to require regulation. In 1312 France's King Philip IV decreed that all nets used to take fish on the lake had to have a minimum mesh size of 25.5 mm (1 inch), the width of a silver tornesel coin. There was also a size minimum for caught fish. The fish on Nyon's coat of arms dates to this time as well; the blue and red background represents its passage from the cold lake water to the hot kitchen. Regulation of fishing on Lake Constance similarly dates to the mid-14th century.

Commercial capture and consumption of fish from other lakes and rivers in what is now Switzerland also dates to medieval times. Records dating from the 15th century record an annual take from Lake Sempach averaging around 180,000 whitefish. Archaeological digs in the northern and eastern regions of the country have found evidence of consumption, and long distance trade with other inland-fishery regions of Central Europe, that corroborates the documentary record of the period. Larger fish were caught by professional fishermen and eaten by nobility, landed gentry and the higher-ranking clergy, while smaller fish were caught and consumed across the social spectrum, primarily by those who ate them. 

Under Roman law, fishing rights in rivers and lakes were royal property; most sovereigns delegated those rights to monasteries or local vassals, who in turn allocated them to local fishermen as they saw fit. The open water in the middle of the lakes was common fishing ground; the shallows near the shore were reserved for the local landowner. By the late medieval period, cities had also gained control over fishing rights in waters beyond their immediate vicinity in order to keep them clear for navigation.

By the early 14th century, fishermen were part of the guilds of various professions—boatmen, mostly, but also bakers, butchers, coopers and weavers—in different cities. In collaboration with the authorities, they negotiated detailed fishing regulations, covering when certain fish could be caught, minimum sizes, maximum quantities, and what equipment could be used to catch them, all with the goal of preventing overfishing.

In 1690, fears of overfishing again led to new regulations on Lake Geneva. Authorities on all jurisdictions in the lakes basin limited the use of fyke nets to the days between March 15 and June 15 annually, to allow certain species to replenish themselves. A minimum size for net mesh was also imposed.

Once fishermen had accumulated a catch worth taking to market, the rules required they first sell them in the city they worked from, in order to ensure a steady and affordable supply of fish for public consumption. An inspector saw to the freshness of fish and that no species were offered for sale that had been taken out of season; fishermen were also required to report any others they saw violating those rules. They were not permitted to sell to a reseller, but they could hire someone to handle the task of selling the fish. Women were excluded from the trade—by law in Berne, Biel and Lausanne, by custom elsewhere.

19th century: Federal and cantonal regulation

Fishing regulations were enforced by the clergy and nobility through their exclusive control of fishing rights, a system that had spread to other Swiss lakes from Lake Geneva until 1798, when their rights were abrogated as "feudal" in the wake of the French Revolution, leaving fisheries unregulated. Several years of overfishing followed, leading to fishermen agreeing to limits again in 1803 after the Act of Mediation. The 17 cantons in which Switzerland's commercially fished lakes lie used powers delegated to them under the 1815 Federal Treaty to begin regulating fishing. As Switzerland began organizing itself into a modern federal state in the middle of the 19th century, the cantons further reasserted control over the lakes.

The canton of Zürich was one of the first to go beyond the use of regulations to keep fisheries sustainable when it established Switzerland's first fish hatchery at Meilen in 1854. It used a new French technique to artificially inseminate fish eggs. After being hatched in closed facilities, the fry were released into rivers, streams and lakes so that they could be caught. By 1880 there were 24 more hatcheries in the country.

After nearly a quarter-century of negotiations, the cantons of Vaud, Fribourg and Neuchâtel reached an agreement on managing Lake Neuchâtel in 1869; it came into force two years later. All three surrendered control over their portion of the lake in order to establish a consistent regime on its entirety. It has been updated ten times since then. 

In 1875 the federal government eventually passed the first Federal Fisheries Law, (FFL) which establishes broad principles of fisheries management. It delegated as much fisheries regulation as possible to the cantons, who usually assigned their police or revenue departments with enforcement and only appointing special fisheries agents during spawning season. Those cantons whose lakes were shared with neighboring countries with working with those countries to jointly regulate the lake fisheries. By the early 1880s Switzerland had reached agreements with France, Italy, Baden and Alsace-Lorraine (the latter two now part of Germany and France respectively).

By this time fishing professionally, previously done on the side by farmers, vintners and other tradesmen, had evolved into a full-time job for more of those who took to the lakes. To protect their interests, primarily the maintenance of a healthy and sustainable fishery, some of these fishermen joined with scientists and sympathetic politicians to form the Swiss Fisheries Association (SFA). Its goals were twofold: to promote measures to protect the fisheries, especially as industrialization spread and hydroelectric plants were built to power new factories and facilities, and to promote research into the fisheries.

Efforts to conserve and protect species began shortly afterwards as well. Fish ladders were built in streams at several locations to facilitate a return to spawning grounds. A report was also prepared on water pollution in the Basel industrial district and its effect on the local fish population. The first of three revisions to the Federal Fisheries Law was made in 1888, taking account of water pollution and setting a framework for cantonal law. In 1893, the German states of Baden, Württemberg (now merged) and Bavaria signed the Bregenz Agreement with Switzerland and Austria, the first regulatory framework covering the entire lake.

In 1887 the rainbow trout was introduced to Lake Geneva and other Swiss waters from its native North America at a time when the true féra, long one of the most popular and abdundant fish in Lake Geneva, was being fished to extinction. It has remained popular with diners but not with fishermen since it tends to eat the eggs of native species. Another North American transplant, catfish, was introduced at the end of the century by a Geneva city councilor who had found it delicious on a trip to Canada. It has thrived despite being another species fishermen resent because it eats primarily the eggs and fry of other species. The experience led later to laws regulating the introduction of nonnative fish species.

20th century: Environmental challenges

In the 20th century the amount of full-time professional fishermen continued to grow. Political pressure from those fishermen on Lake Geneva, particularly from Vaud, led the federal government to withdraw in 1911 from the 1880 agreement with France, seven years after it had been renewed and updated, on the grounds that French fishermen on the lake were not respecting its terms. Two years later Vaud joined with the neighboring cantons of Geneva and Valais to regulate fishing in the Swiss portion of the lake, under the same general terms as the 1904 agreement with France.

France and Switzerland tried unsuccessfully to negotiate a new agreement in 1924, the same year professional fishermen formed the Swiss Professional Fishermen's Association. Fears that this growth could lead to overfishing were met with restrictions on newer, stronger nets used for bottom fishing and, in the middle of the century, a cap on the number of licenses issued by the cantons, in favor of full-time fishermen with the best training and equipment.

The introduction of artificial fiber nets in the 1950s allowed perch to emerge as a popular species. While it had always been taken and eaten, a fisherman who put some of the perch in his catch through an industrial potato peeler found that it neatly removed the fish's scales and skin, leaving behind two boneless filets ready for preparation and cooking; local restaurants came up with their own recipes, and by the end of the century demand for perch filets had grown to the point where most had to be imported.

Water pollution grew into a large enough problem to adversely affect the Swiss fishing industry by the middle of the 20th century. Annual fish catches began declining from record levels, forcing some longtime fishermen to leave the industry. Phosphates, from detergent and other sources, draining into the lakes and slowly causing eutrophication were identified as the primary cause, and beginning in the 1970s environmental regulations were promulgated and enforced. The third revision of the FFL, in 1973, emphasized sustainability of yields and the protection of particularly valuable species.

In 1980, France and Switzerland returned to the negotiating table and reached a new agreement for jointly managing and protecting Lake Geneva. Starting in 1986, the two countries committed themselves to a series of five-year plans. This led to the establishment of the Commission internationale pour la protection des eaux du Léman (CIPEL), the current joint commission, and policies that allow fishermen from either country to fish anywhere on the lake.

Beginning in 1985, phosphate levels in the lakes began declining. At first this had a beneficial effect on fishing.

In 1991 the FFL was revised again. This update, the most recent , added provisions for the biodiversity of the lakes and extended prioritized protections to all species native to them, not just those most economically valuable.

Later in the decade, the paucity of phosphates promoted reoligotrophication of the lakes. Algal blooms began declining, and lake waters became clearer and colder. Catches began to decline, even as 50 million stocked fish were released into the lakes in 1996, because the algae had served to nourish the phytoplankton which fed the smaller species eaten in turn by perch, whitefish and other species favored by Swiss diners.

21st century: Decline in fishermen and other challenges

Fishermen were on average making two-thirds of what they had been during the 1980s. In addition to the low phosphate counts in the water, they and their organizations also faulted the cantons for not meeting their legal obligations, and the effects of increased use of hydroelectric power, since it interfered with fish's ability to spawn in some streams. A mid-2000s "living water" initiative sponsored by the SFA was meant to counter that by, among other things, amending the federal constitution to allow fishing and environmental groups an increased right of appeal on government decisions in those areas; it was not supported by other groups with similar interests.

Another government environmental effort has given Swiss fishermen cause for concern. Following Japan's Fukushima nuclear accident in 2011, renewed anti-nuclear protests swept across the country, and the government soon responded by announcing that while it would continue using the five reactors it then had online, it would not replace them as they reached the end of their usability, with the goal of phasing out nuclear power completely by 2034. Voters endorsed this plan in a 2017 referendum.

To replace the reactors, which in the 2000s accounted for slightly more than a third of Switzerland's generating capacity, while addressing climate change, the government intends to rely more on renewable energy, particularly hydroelectric. As part of the nuclear phase-out, capacity for that energy is to be increased 6 percent by 2035. The law requires those plants to reduce their negative environmental impact by 2030, but fishermen still fear their effects, noting that the hydro plants, already on most of the country's waterways, serve as obstacles or outright barriers to fish swimming to upstream spawning grounds. In the canton of Bern, for instance, dams prevent fish from traveling to the upper reaches of the Aare.

With the cleaner waters, cormorants, not seen since the Middle Ages, began returning to Swiss lakes in the 2000s. By 2015, a thousand nesting couples had been counted, mostly in lakeside sanctuaries, with five to six times that number joining them for the winter months. Since each adult bird consumes on average  of fish a day, fishermen see them as unwelcome competitors. The cormorants also damage nets and traps beyond the point of repair in order to take their fish, which further hinders fishing. As the birds are strictly protected, fishermen on Lake Neuchâtel have staged protests on the water, suggesting that without action to allow them to protect their catch they might take measures of their own. In 2008 it was estimated that cormorant predation cost fishermen on the lake CHF 210,000 a year; the authorities closed off access to part of the shoreline and removed the nests left by the bird couples from previous seasons on the lake islands popular with them.

Fishermen on Lake Geneva point out that there, at least, the birds are not entirely to blame for declining catches. According to CIPEL, only three percent of the lake's shoreline is in its original natural state of coastal marsh, where fish can breed with less fear of bird attacks. More than 60 percent of the lake's  of shoreline has become completely artificial, in the form of retaining walls or riprap. Swiss law currently requires the cantons to take actions to restore all watercourses and waterbodies to as close to their natural state as possible by the end of the century; the federal government has set aside CHF 40 million in its budget each year to help them reach this goal.

As catches have declined in the first two decades of the 21st century, so too have the fishermen themselves making them. By 2015 there were 284 professional fishermen left in Switzerland, a third as many as there were in 1970, with only 181 of them doing it full-time; in 2009 one of the six fishermen still plying the waters of Lake Thun recalled that earlier in his 30-year career there had been 40 of them. Some of this decline is due to government policy of letting licenses expire once the fishermen who hold them retire, instead of granting them to another entrant, in order to prevent overfishing. But fishermen say that the profession has gotten so unprofitable due to the pressure on the fish populations that many younger fishermen have to work other jobs to maintain an income. In 2018, the average age of the eight fishermen in the canton of St. Gallen who fished Lake Constance was 60.

Fisheries

Switzerland has  of lake surface area, or 91 percent of the total, of which is used for commercial fishing. Lake Geneva is the largest, and  Lake Hallwil in the cantons of Aargau and Lucerne the smallest to support a commercial fishery.

Lake Geneva is also the country's largest fishery, producing almost  in 2018, about a quarter of the total national catch of  that year, the most recent  for which reliable statistics are available. Measured by productivity, small Lake Sempach is first, with its fishermen taking in 5.56 kg of fish (predominantly whitefish) per hectare (ha) of surface area, with Lake Zürich second at 2.28 kg/ha. Lake Constance is the least productive, with 76 g/ha coming from its waters.

Half of the catch is whitefish. The  of perch makes it the second most commonly caught species, accounting for nearly 27 percent of the total.

The  of pike,  of which come from Lake Geneva, make it fourth. Some less common species are concentrated in particular lakes, like bream in Lake Zürich and agone in Lake Maggiore. Since Swiss consumers generally dislike roach and bream, those species are considered bycatch.

Shellfishes, such as crayfish, are also found in the Swiss lakes. Their consumption is, however, very rare.

Fishermen and fleet

In 2016, Switzerland's Federal Office for the Environment reported that the country had that year issued 270 licenses to 263 fishermen. Of those, 163, or 62 percent, were Category 1 licenses issued to those who derived no less than 90 percent of their income from fishing. Category 2 licenses, issued to those for whom fishing accounted for 30–90 percent of their income, went to 58, or 22 percent. In the lowest level, Category 3, for fishermen making less than 30 percent, were 49, or 19 percent.

A majority of fishermen in 2016 were between the ages of 45 and 75, accounting for over 150. The smallest age bracket were a few under 26; there were also about 10 over the age of 86. Younger fishermen were more likely to hold Category 1 licenses, while conversely the older fishermen held fewer. Women held 18 licenses, roughly 7 percent of the total.

Swiss fishermen ply the lakes in small, open boats with outboard motors and space for nets, traps and coolers in the back. They rarely have more than one other person working in the boat. No purpose-built fishing vessels such as trawlers like those used by marine fishermen in other countries are in use.

Angling

Fishing for personal consumption, with a rod from the shore rather than a net from a boat, was provided for under medieval law. Until the mid-19th century most anglers fished for food and some additional income; only with industrialization did angling become primarily a recreational activity, first in the rivers, then the lakes. A century later there were 80,000 licensed or otherwise known sport fishermen; by 2008 the number had reached 100,000 

Today recreational fishing under cantonal license is popular in Switzerland, both with the Swiss themselves and visitors from abroad, many attracted to the challenges and rewards of fly fishing in the mountain streams. It is estimated as of 2008 that 275,000 people total fish the country's streams and lakes recreationally every year, generating CHF 46.6 million in annual revenue on tackle.

Swiss government statistics for 2018 show that anglers took  of fish that year,  of that from the country's lakes. The  put them in third. Anglers take three times as many lake trout.

As with professional fishing, lakes Geneva and Zurich rank first and second in accounting for the greatest shares of the recreational catch, with  respectively. Anglers' take from Lake Brienz slightly exceeds the commercial catch.

Anglers have sometimes come into conflict with the country's professional fishermen. In 2016 the former complained that regulations on their activities on Lake Constance scheduled to come into effect at the beginning of the following year were not only unduly burdensome to them but detrimental to the lake's already stressed fishery. They included a limit of 12 whitefish and 30 perch per angler per day, and an absolute ban on returning any undersized fish to the lake, which they considered unfair given that their license fees went to subsidizing commercial fishing on the lake (they themselves are, unlike anglers in some other European countries, not allowed to sell any of their catch), and that when the lake is closed to anglers during December the professional fishermen take most of its whitefish to meet holiday demand for caviar. Anglers were also opposed to proposals by the professional fishermen to release more phosphates into the lake to increase fish stocks. 

A spokesman for the Swiss Professional Fisheries Association responded that the 12 whitefish constituted  of fish and said that recreational fishermen should be focused on enjoying themselves and nature, not how many fish they catch. He defended the need to increase the lake's phosphate counts, noting that in the wake of heavy flooding of the Upper Rhine the year before professional fishermen on Constance had seen an increase in their catch, the fishes' stomachs filled with phytoplankton. A spokesman for the anglers responded that that was due to an increase in mosquito larvae in the lake's shallows after the flood. Both groups expressed an interest in working together to resolve these differences.

Catch and release restrictions

In 2008, as part of a larger animal welfare bill, the Swiss Federal Assembly limited catch and release fishing; the law took effect the following year. It is often represented as an outright ban; in fact, anglers are allowed to release fish they catch as long as they:

 do not go fishing with the express intention of releasing any fish they catch,
 are reasonably certain that the fish will survive,
 handle the fish respectfully,
 take personal responsibility for the consequences of releasing the fish,
 release the fish as soon as possible after catching it, and
 do so for what they believe to be good environmental reasons.

Fish may not be released at all if they are of a species not native to Swiss waters, such as rainbow trout, or are within legal size for their species and are in a habitat where cantonal regulations declare their natural reproduction to be impossible and are therefore stocked (such as most of the country's mountain lakes). No fishable waters anywhere in the country may be posted as "no kill" or "catch and release".

Cantons may provide for additional methods if they are humane. Anglers whose license terms are a month or more in length are required to take a two-day class in angling knowledge, including these methods of killing fish. The law also bans the use of barbed hooks and live bait except for limited circumstances.

The year after the regulations came into effect, anglers' total take, which had previously well exceeded  a year, dropped well below that. It would not reach previous levels until 2015, and since then has returned to  range.

Fish farming

Fish farming, or pisciculture, has been recorded in Switzerland since antiquity. Monasteries kept vivaria, small fish ponds, to ensure a regular supply for their own needs. These were expanded in the 1400s when specialists in their management emerged. The specialist combined fattened fish in ponds with feed fish, taking them out once they had reached salable size. By 1742, according to the regulations of the Abbey of Saint Gall, the system had reached three separate ponds for its carp: one for spawning, a "stretch pond" in which the fry thus spawned grew, and a settling pond where they were fattened until consumption.

A small commercial pisciculture industry developed during the 20th century, concentrating on raising rainbow and brook trout, all for the domestic market. In 1974, a combined  of both species were produced by 30 farmers; this accounted for 23 percent of domestic consumption, with the rest taken up by farmed trout imported from Denmark, France and Italy. A few farmers, in the western portion of the country, raised carp, which despite its historical cultivation is a difficult species to farm in Switzerland due to its preference for water temperatures that cannot be easily maintained in the earthen ponds used. The  so produced in 1975 was consumed entirely domestically, often sold directly to homemakers who prepared them for their families.

Swiss pisciculture production was then growing at an annual rate of 10 percent. Later in the decade it rose sharply, to more than four times that level. It remained there, in the range of  a year, as professional capture fishing's still-greater take began to decline in the 2000s. In the late 2010s pisciculture production began to increase sharply, and in 2016 for the first time Switzerland's fish farms outproduced its fishing boats. 

Statistics breaking down the farms' output by species for 2015 show that rainbow trout accounts for 82 percent of their output. Perch, at 10 percent, and tilapia at 4 percent, are the next most farmed species, with sea trout, sturgeon and char making up the balance at that time.

Fish farming in Switzerland has long been done in private pools or ponds isolated from the country's waterways and waterbodies. In 2020 a German cooperative proposed a whitefish farm using cages in Lake Constance as a way to boost that lake's declining catches. Swiss fishermen joined their German colleagues in vehement opposition to the project, staging a 100-boat flotilla on the lake one weekend as a protest. They were concerned about not only the pollution that might occur but the possible spread of disease from farmed fish to the wild population their livelihood depends on, no matter what assurances the cooperative made about being able to prevent that. While the IGKB, the tri-national commission that regulates the lake, already prohibits caged fish farming within the lake, the fishermen want the ban to be made statutory as well.

In the 2010s a new species has been added to Switzerland's pisciculture portfolio: Atlantic salmon. Swiss Lachs installed a recirculating aquaculture system at its Swiss Alpine Fish facility in the Graubünden village of Lostallo in 2015, where it had previously raised rainbow trout, and began raising salmon the following year from Icelandic eggs, in water drawn from the nearby Moesa River. Those first fish were brought to market in 2018. The company estimates it can produce up to  a year, most of which will be sold fresh, direct to domestic consumers; it hopes to soon expand capacity and triple that output. Other Swiss fish farmers are exploring the possibility of raising species not usually associated with the country, such as shrimp.

Fish processing

Since most of the Swiss catch is eaten, most processing is limited to preparing fish for sale, often just freezing it when necessary. Swiss Lachs, and some other farmers, have also opened artisanal smokehouses for their products; the former estimates it gives this treatment to about 20 percent of its output. Fish oil is also produced for pharmaceutical use.

Management and regulations

Guiding principles for Swiss fisheries management are set by the FFL. The cantons enact specific statutory and regulatory provisions within those principles. Cantonal laws set, for instance, the fees and terms of various fishing licenses, transactions in fishing rights, and grant the government the power to regulate fishing activities for safety and environmental reasons.

Two general principles guide fisheries management across the country. The first is to favor natural reproduction, by allowing all fish the opportunity to spawn at least once before possibly being caught. This is achieved by minimum mesh sizes in the nets used by commercial fishermen, and minimum sizes for their recreational counterparts.

The second principle is an ambitious stocking program. The federal and cantonal governments both support these efforts financially, although only in western Switzerland is it carried out by the government, usually the cantons. In the east, while the cantons administer the programs, commercial fishermen, along with some recreational anglers, do the actual stocking. Perch is abundant enough that it does not have to be stocked.

See also

Fishing industry by country
Merchant marine of Switzerland
Agriculture in Switzerland

Notes

References

External links

Industry in Switzerland
Switzerland